The Latvian Mixed Doubles Curling Championship is the national championship of mixed doubles curling in Latvia. It has been held annually since 2007. It is organized by the Latvian Curling Association.

The championship is usually held in November or December in the previous calendar year (i.e. "2018" means "championship of 2018–2019 season"). The winning team represents Latvia at the  later in the season.

List of champions and medallists

Medals record for curlers 
As of 2022

References

See also
Latvian Men's Curling Championship
Latvian Women's Curling Championship
Latvian Mixed Curling Championship
Latvian Junior Curling Championships

Curling competitions in Latvia
National curling championships
Recurring sporting events established in 2007
2007 establishments in Latvia
Curling
Mixed doubles curling